Cucchi is an Italian surname. Notable people with the surname include:
Cristiana Cucchi, Italian vocalist
Éber Luís Cucchi, Brazilian footballer 
Enrico Cucchi, (1965–1996), Italian footballer 
Enzo Cucchi, Italian painter
Ilaria Cucchi, Italian activist and politician, sister of Stefano
Stefano Cucchi, Italian man, brother of Ilaria, whose death is the subject of On My Skin (2018 film)